Marvin Bagley III (born March 16, 1999) is an American professional basketball player for the Detroit Pistons of the National Basketball Association (NBA). He played college basketball for the Duke Blue Devils and was a 2018 Consensus All-American. He was selected with the second overall pick by the Sacramento Kings in the 2018 NBA draft. At the end of the 2018–19 season Bagley was selected to the NBA All-Rookie First Team. After spending 3 and half seasons with the Kings he was traded to the Pistons at the 2022 trade deadline.

High school career
Bagley attended Corona del Sol High School in Tempe, Arizona as a freshman and Hillcrest Prep in Phoenix, Arizona as a sophomore. During that sophomore year, he was teammates with future #1 pick Deandre Ayton. He left Hillcrest Prep in November 2015. In January 2016, he enrolled in Sierra Canyon School in Chatsworth, California. He was ruled ineligible to play his first year at Sierra Canyon due to California Interscholastic Federation (CIF) rules. That ruling would help play a factor into reclassifying his senior year of high school up a year early. In his last season for Sierra Canyon, he averaged 24.9 points per game and 10.1 rebounds per game. He would be named for the All-USA Today First-team in 2017.

Recruiting
Bagley was rated as a five-star recruit throughout his high school career and was formerly ranked as the top player in the 2018 class before his reclassification. Bagley was ranked the No.1 overall recruit and No.1 power forward in the 2017 high school class. His first college basketball scholarship came from Northern Arizona University when he was 14. 

Before beginning what would have been his senior year of high school, Bagley reclassified into the Class of 2017. On August 14, 2017, he announced that he successfully reclassified as a graduate from Sierra Canyon and was eligible to play college basketball for Duke University during the 2017–18 NCAA Division I men's basketball season. thus allowing him to enter the 2018 NBA draft as an early entry in the collegiate level. He graduated from Sierra Canyon on September 1, 2017 and went to Duke after finishing high school academics a week later.

College career

Bagley made his Duke debut on November 10, 2017, recording 25 points and 10 rebounds in a win over Elon University. On November 13, 2017, Bagley was named ACC rookie of the week. On November 24, Bagley scored 34 points and made a freshman record 15 rebounds for Duke as they defeated the Texas Longhorns 85–78 in overtime. He tied the freshman record for rebounds in the next game 4 days later and scored 30 points in an 87–84 win over the Florida Gators, It was the first time a Duke player did so since the 1960s. On November 29, 2017, Bagley tallied 23 points and 10 rebounds in a 91–81 victory against Indiana. On December 30, Bagley recorded 32 points and a record 21 rebounds in a 100–93 win over the Florida State Seminoles. On December 4, 2017, Bagley earned ACC rookie of the week honors for the third time. With 30 points and 11 rebounds in an 89–71 win over the Wake Forest Demon Deacons on January 13, 2018, he became the ACC's record holder for most 30 point, 10 rebound double-doubles in a season. On January 15, 2018, Bagley earned his fifth ACC rookie of the week honor. On March 3, 2018, Marvin scored 21 points and 15 rebounds in a 74–64 win over rival North Carolina. 

At the end of the regular season, Bagley was named both the ACC's Rookie of the Year and Player of the Year, as well as a member of the All-ACC first team. He was also named a consensus member of the All-American First-Team by multiple organizations. In addition to that, Bagley joined Deandre Ayton and Trae Young as the most freshmen players to join the consensus All-American First-Team in a season.

Following Duke's loss in the 2018 NCAA men's basketball tournament, Bagley announced his intention to forgo his final three seasons of collegiate eligibility and declare for the 2018 NBA draft.

Professional career

Sacramento Kings (2018–2022)

On June 21, 2018, Bagley was selected second overall in the 2018 NBA draft by the Sacramento Kings, behind his former high school teammate Deandre Ayton. On July 1, 2018, he signed a rookie scale contract with the Kings.

Bagley made his professional debut with Sacramento on October 17, 2018, with 6 points and 5 rebounds in only 12 minutes coming off the bench in a 123–117 loss to the Utah Jazz. In his next game two days later, Bagley recorded 19 points, 8 rebounds, 3 assists, and 3 blocks in a 149–129 loss to the New Orleans Pelicans. On November 24, Bagley had a double-double of 20 points and 17 rebounds coming off the bench in a 117–116 loss to the Golden State Warriors. During their second match against Golden State on December 14, he sprained his left knee, which sidelined him for 11 games. On March 19, 2019, Bagley scored a career-high 28 points off the bench in a 123–121 loss to the Brooklyn Nets, in which the Kings entered the fourth quarter with a 25-point lead.

On October 24, 2019, Bagley was diagnosed to have a non-displaced fracture in his right thumb and was expected to be sidelined for about four to six weeks. Instead, he only played 13 games before the season was suspended due to the COVID-19 pandemic on March 11, 2020. On July 19, 2020, he sustained a right foot injury during practice, and was expected to miss the remainder of 2019–20 season.

On December 4, 2020, the Sacramento Kings announced that they had exercised their option on Bagley.

Before the start of the 2021–22 season, the Kings informed Bagley that he would not be part of the rotation after not reaching an agreement on a contract extension.

Detroit Pistons (2022–present) 
On February 10, 2022, Bagley was traded to the Detroit Pistons as part of a four-team trade that sent Donte DiVincenzo, Josh Jackson, and Trey Lyles to the Kings. On February 14, Bagley made his Pistons debut, recording 10 points, eight rebounds and one assist in a 103–94 loss to the Washington Wizards.

On July 6, 2022, Bagley re-signed with the Pistons on a three-year, $37.5 million contract. On February 25, 2023, after missing over a month with a hand injury, Bagley scored 21 points and grabbed 18 rebounds during a 95–91 loss to the Toronto Raptors.

Career statistics

NBA

Regular season

|-
| style="text-align:left;"|
| style="text-align:left;"|Sacramento
| 62 || 4 || 25.3 || .504 || .313 || .691 || 7.6 || 1.0 || .5 || 1.0 || 14.9
|-
| style="text-align:left;"|
| style="text-align:left;"|Sacramento
| 13 || 6 || 25.7 || .467 || .182 || .806 || 7.5 || .8 || .5 || .9 || 14.2
|-
| style="text-align:left;"|
| style="text-align:left;"|Sacramento
| 43 || 42 || 25.9 || .504 || .343 || .575 || 7.4 || 1.0 || .5 || .5 || 14.1
|-
| style="text-align:left;"|
| style="text-align:left;"|Sacramento
| 30 || 17 || 21.9 || .463 || .242 || .745 || 7.2 || .6 || .3 || .4 || 9.3
|-
| style="text-align:left;"|
| style="text-align:left;"|Detroit
| 18 || 8 || 27.2 || .555 || .229 || .593 || 6.8 || 1.1 || .7 || .4 || 14.6
|- class="sortbottom"
| style="text-align:center;" colspan="2"|Career
| 166 || 77 || 25.1 || .501 || .291 || .663 || 7.4 || .9 || .5 || .7 || 13.6

College

|-
| style="text-align:left;"|2017–18
| style="text-align:left;"|Duke
| 33 || 32 || 33.9 || .614 || .397 || .627 || 11.1 || 1.5 || .8 || .9 || 21.0

Personal life
Bagley has two younger brothers: Marcus and Martray. His father, Marvin Jr., played college football at North Carolina A&T, as well as with the Arizona Rattlers professionally. His father met his wife, Tracy Caldwell, while Marvin Jr. was playing with the Rattlers in the Arena Football League. Marvin Jr. currently coaches AAU basketball for the Nike Phamily. Bagley's younger brother, Marcus played at Arizona State University. While living in the Los Angeles area, Bagley volunteered at Hoops with Heart, a non-profit organization in the city that benefits underprivileged youth. He is also the grandson of former Olympic and professional basketball player Jumpin' Joe Caldwell, who was the number two overall pick in the 1964 NBA draft.

Music career
Other than basketball, Bagley is a rapper and hip hop artist. He is known for writing his own raps in his free time and creating a variety of music. His songs range from those that tell his story to those that are made to relate to. His album "Big Jreams" was released on August 24, 2019. His album features artists such as Iman Shumpert and Famous Los.

See also
 List of second-generation National Basketball Association players

References

External links

 Duke Blue Devils bio
 USA Basketball bio

1999 births
Living people
All-American college men's basketball players
American men's basketball players
Basketball players from Arizona
Basketball players from California
Detroit Pistons players
Duke Blue Devils men's basketball players
Power forwards (basketball)
Sacramento Kings draft picks
Sacramento Kings players
Sierra Canyon School alumni
Sportspeople from Tempe, Arizona